Robinsonekspedisjonen: 2002, was the fourth season of the Norwegian version of the Swedish show Expedition Robinson and it premiered on 22 September 2002 and aired until 15 December 2002. The fourth season took place on an island in Malaysia. For the fourth season the amount of contestants was raised from sixteen to eighteen. The first twist this season took place in episode one when both tribes were forced to vote out one member prior to their first immunity challenge. As another twist this season when a contestant was voted out they were sent to "destiny island". Ann Molvig eventually won the final duel and returned to the game. Once on the island the ousted contestant would compete in a series of duels with other eliminated players in order to gain a spot in the final five. Ultimately, it was Ann Molvig who won the season over Halvard Fence with an initial jury vote of 5-5, and eventually a 6-4 vote when Bjørn Jarli changed his vote.

Finishing order

Voting history

External links
http://www.dagbladet.no/kultur/2002/09/16/348930.html?s=1&i=20

 2002
2002 Norwegian television seasons